Beno is a name of various origins. In the Bible it appears in 1 Chronicles 24:26–27 where the Hebrew word  is rendered as "Beno" in some English translations and as "his son" in others. Beno is also a short form of Benedict in various languages. It is also a place name in multiple languages.

People

Given name
Beno of Santi Martino e Silvestro, Roman Catholic cardinal
Beno Axionov (born 1946), Russian-Moldovan actor, director, drama teacher and screenwriter
Beno Blachut (1913–1985), Czech operatic tenor
Beno Bryant (born 1971), American football player
Beno Dorn, Polish-English master tailor
Beno Eckmann (1917–2008), Swiss mathematician
Beno Gutenberg (1889–1960), German-American seismologist 
Benő Káposzta (born 1942), Hungarian footballer
Beno Lapajne (born 1973), Slovenian handball player
Beno Obano (born 1994), English rugby union player
Beno Udrih (born 1982), Slovenian basketball player 
Beno Zephine N L (born 1990), Indian Foreign Service officer
Beno Zupančič (1925–1980), Slovene writer and journalist

Surname
Lukáš Beňo (born 1989), Slovak footballer

Places
Beno Airport, serving Beno, Democratic Republic of the Congo

See also
David Benveniste, nickname "Beno" (born 1970), American entrepreneur

References

Modern names of Hebrew origin